Connect the Dots is a 2010 album by singer-songwriter Stacy Clark.

Track listing

Reception
Connect the Dots was received positively by critics. Amazon listed the album as number 70 on its top 100 albums of 2011. The Orange County Registrar gave the album an A−, stating that Clark "compiled another trove of gems that certainly work well side-by-side as a statement on the perils of love and relationships."

Chart performance

References

2010 albums
Folk albums by American artists